William Cliffton (1771 – December 1799) was a Philadelphian poet and pamphleteer.  He is the only identified member of the Anchor Club.  He is considered part of the "transitive state" of American poetry.

Born the son of a wealthy Quaker, Cliffton suffered form a blood clot at the age of nineteen, and from then until his death, aged twenty-seven, pursued an almost exclusively literary life, though he took an interest in field sports.

Cliffton was a supporter of William Cobbett.  He died in December 1799 from consumption.

Works
 A Poetical Rhapsody of the Times.. (as Dick Retort) (1796) 
 A Flight of Fancy (1800)

References
 

American male poets
1772 births
1799 deaths